Micah Jacob Schwartzman (born June 1976) is the Joseph W. Dorn Research Professor of Law at the University of Virginia School of Law. In 1997, Schwartzman was given a Rhodes Scholarship.

References

External links
 Faculty page

American lawyers
American Rhodes Scholars
1976 births
Place of birth missing (living people)
University of Virginia School of Law faculty
Living people